Jamie Leweling (born 26 February 2001) is a German professional footballer who plays as a midfielder for Bundesliga club Union Berlin.

Club career
Leweling made his professional debut for Greuther Fürth in the 2. Bundesliga on 28 July 2019, coming on as a substitute in the 85th minute for Tobias Mohr in the home match against Erzgebirge Aue, which finished as a 0–2 loss.

Union Berlin 
On 17 May 2022, it was confirmed that Leweling would join Bundesliga side Union Berlin for the 2022–23 season.

International career
Born in Germany, Leweling is of Ghanaian descent. He was called up to represent the Ghana national football team in October 2020.

References

External links
 
 Profile at kicker.de

2001 births
Living people
Footballers from Nuremberg
German footballers
German sportspeople of Ghanaian descent
Association football midfielders
SpVgg Greuther Fürth players
1. FC Union Berlin players
Bundesliga players
2. Bundesliga players
Germany under-21 international footballers